Nu tändas tusen juleljus may refer to:

Nu tändas tusen juleljus, Swedish Christmas song
Nu tändas tusen juleljus (Anna-Lena Löfgren album), 1969
Nu tändas tusen juleljus (Agnetha Fältskog & Linda Ulvaeus album), 1981
Nu tändas tusen juleljus (Åsa Jinder album), 2008